Çatalpınar is a town and district of Ordu Province in the Black Sea region of Turkey, 56 km from the city of Ordu and 20 km from the town of Fatsa. According to the 2000 census, population of the district is 23,192 of which 10,265 live in the town of Çatalpınar.

The local economy depends on agriculture, particularly growing hazelnuts and grazing animals. There is a mineral water spring in the village of Elmaköy.

Notes

References

External links
 District governor's official website 
 Road map of Çatalpınar and environs
 Detailed map of Çatalpınar district
 Various images of Çatalpınar, Ordu

Populated places in Ordu Province
Districts of Ordu Province